Felice Newman is an American author, publisher, sex educator, and coach of soma studies (unconscious patterns of muscular activity rooted in past experience).

Education
Newman has a somatic coaching certificate through the Strozzi Institute, based in Petaluma, CA. Newman studied human sexuality through the San Francisco Sex Information and The Body Electric School.

Career
Newman founded Cleis Press, an independent publishing company, in 1980 with Frédérique Delacoste. The first book published by Cleis Press was Fight Back!: Feminist Resistance to Male Violence coedited by Newman and Delacoste. Since then, Cleis Press has published more than 200 books on sexuality, feminism, and gender. The company has developed and edited sex books by sex authors including Susie Bright, Tristan Taormino, Violet Blue, Patrick Califia, and Annie Sprinkle.

Newman is the author of The Whole Lesbian Sex Book: A Passionate Guide for All of Us and co-editor (with Frédérique Delacoste) of Best Sex Writing 2006.

Newman has appeared on Loveline, Derek & Romaine Show, Jimmy Kimmel (1999) and other radio programs.

Her online sex advice has appeared on About.com, ClassicDykes.com, and LesbiaNation.com. Her "Whole Lesbian Sex" column appears in newspapers across the U.S.

References

External links
Official website
Whole Lesbian Sex Book
Best Sex Writing 2006

Sex educators
Year of birth missing (living people)
Living people
American lesbian writers
21st-century American women writers